Spodnja Libna is a settlement east of the town of Krško in eastern Slovenia. The area is part of the traditional region of Styria. It is now included with the rest of the municipality in the Lower Sava Statistical Region.

References

External links
Spodnja Libna on Geopedia

Populated places in the Municipality of Krško